The Communauté d'agglomération Tarbes-Lourdes-Pyrénées is an intercommunal structure in the Hautes-Pyrénées department, in the Occitanie region, southern France. It was created in January 2017. Its seat is in Juillan. Its area is 614.8 km2. Its population was 123,588 in 2017, of which 41,518 in Tarbes proper.

Composition
The communauté d'agglomération consists of the following 86 communes:

Adé
Allier
Les Angles
Angos
Arcizac-Adour
Arcizac-ez-Angles
Arrayou-Lahitte
Arrodets-ez-Angles
Artigues
Aspin-en-Lavedan
Aureilhan
Aurensan
Averan
Azereix
Barbazan-Debat
Barlest
Barry
Bartrès
Bazet
Bénac
Berbérust-Lias
Bernac-Debat
Bernac-Dessus
Bordères-sur-l'Échez
Bourréac
Bours
Cheust
Chis
Escoubès-Pouts
Gardères
Gayan
Gazost
Ger
Germs-sur-l'Oussouet
Geu
Gez-ez-Angles
Hibarette
Horgues
Ibos
Jarret
Juillan
Julos
Juncalas
Lagarde
Laloubère
Lamarque-Pontacq
Lanne
Layrisse
Lézignan
Loubajac
Loucrup
Louey
Lourdes
Lugagnan
Luquet
Momères
Montignac
Odos
Omex
Orincles
Orleix
Ossen
Ossun
Ossun-ez-Angles
Ourdis-Cotdoussan
Ourdon
Oursbelille
Ousté
Paréac
Peyrouse
Poueyferré
Saint-Créac
Saint-Martin
Saint-Pé-de-Bigorre
Salles-Adour
Sarniguet
Sarrouilles
Ségus
Séméac
Sère-Lanso
Séron
Soues
Tarbes
Vielle-Adour
Viger
Visker

References

Agglomeration communities in France
Intercommunalities of Hautes-Pyrénées